The  Pittsburgh Gladiators season was the fourth season for the Arena Football League franchise, and its final season in Pittsburgh.  The following year, the franchise moved south to Florida and became the Tampa Bay Storm.

Regular season

Schedule

Standings

y – clinched regular-season title

x – clinched playoff spot

Playoffs

Roster

Awards

References

External links
 1990 Pittsburgh Gladiators season at arenafan.com

Pittsburgh Gladiators
Tampa Bay Storm seasons
Pittsburgh Gladiators